The 2011 Etisalat Emirates Cup final was the 3rd final since its establishment.  The match took place at the Mohammad bin Zayed Stadium, Abu Dhabi, on 29 April 2011. The match was won by Al Shabab, who beat Al Ain 2–3 to win their first title. and it was refereed by Ali Hamad.

Road to the final

Pre-match

Venue

On 3 April, UAE Football League Announced that the final will be held for the second time at Mohammed Bin Zayed Stadium in Abu Dhabi, on April 29. The first was on 3 April 2009, won by Al Ain defeating rival Al Wahda 1–0.

Ticketing
The Tickets were sold on the same day of the match, price from AED20.

Match

Match details

Assistant referees:
Saeed Al Houti
Zayed Dawood Kamal
Fourth official:
Adel Al Naqbi

See also
2011 UAE President's Cup Final
2011 UAE Super Cup

References

2011
2010–11 in Emirati football
Al Ain FC matches
Al Shabab Al Arabi Club matches